Roy Selwyn-Smith (22 September 1923 in Walton-on-Thames – 16 June 2006), was well known as a sculptor of English plastic figures and toy soldiers.

Following World War II service as a merchant navy radio operator in the North Atlantic, Selwyn-Smith joined Myer Zang's Modern Packages where he learned sculpting and plastic moulding from 1947 to 1949. He then joined Willmore & Sons that made moulds for lead hollow cast figures for Timpo. Selwyn-Smith used his wife Mary as a model for a figure of a woman leaning against her suitcase.

In 1951 Selwyn-Smith formed Selwyn until his backer committed suicide and the moulds were sold to W. Britain.

Returning to Zang, he developed the Herald Miniatures plastic figures with Zang that Britains distributed from 1954 until the firm was purchased by Britains in 1959. Selwyn-Smith also developed Britains Swoppets where figures could be assembled and combined with pieces of different coloured plastic to form a variety of poses that was patented in 1956.

References

Model manufacturers of the United Kingdom
1923 births
2006 deaths
British Merchant Navy personnel of World War II